Homoeosoma albescentellum is a species of snout moth in the genus Homoeosoma. It was described by Émile Louis Ragonot in 1887. It is found in western North America, including California, Nevada and Washington.

References

Moths described in 1887
Phycitini